Ulla Margrethe Sandbæk (born 1943) is a former Danish Member of the European Parliament for the June Movement.

She served from 1994 to 2004.  She was responsible for the Sandbæk report that resulted in a European Union regulation increasing funding for the United Nations Population Fund, which controversially included funding abortion.

In 2015, she was elected to the Danish parliament for the pro-European The Alternative.

References

1943 births
Living people
June Movement MEPs
MEPs for Denmark 1994–1999
MEPs for Denmark 1999–2004
20th-century women MEPs for Denmark
21st-century women MEPs for Denmark
Women members of the Folketing
Members of the Folketing 2015–2019